Infra may refer to:

 Infra-, an English language prefix
 Infra, a Latin legal term
 Infra, a term used to cite subsequent material in academic sources; see 
Infra (album), 2010, by Max Richter
Infra (video game), 2016
Infra Corporation, an American software company
Infraware, an American software company

See also